Roger Joseph Zelazny (May 13, 1937 – June 14, 1995) was an American poet and writer of fantasy and science fiction short stories and novels, best known for The Chronicles of Amber.  He won the Nebula Award three times (out of 14 nominations) and the Hugo Award six times (also out of 14 nominations), including two Hugos for novels:  the serialized novel ...And Call Me Conrad (1965), subsequently published under the title This Immortal (1966) and then the novel Lord of Light (1967).

Biography
Zelazny was born in Euclid, Ohio, the only child of Polish immigrant Joseph Frank Żelazny and Irish-American Josephine Flora Sweet. In high school, he became the editor of the school newspaper and joined the Creative Writing Club.  In the fall of 1955, he began attending Western Reserve University and graduated with a B.A. in English in 1959.  He was accepted to Columbia University in New York and specialized in Elizabethan and Jacobean drama, graduating with an M.A. in 1962.  His M.A. thesis was entitled Two traditions and Cyril Tourneur: an examination of morality and humor comedy conventions in The Revenger's Tragedy.

Between 1962 and 1969 he worked for the U.S. Social Security Administration in Cleveland, Ohio, and then in Baltimore, Maryland, spending his evenings writing science fiction.   He deliberately progressed from short-shorts to novelettes to novellas and finally to novel-length works by 1965.  On May 1, 1969, he quit to become a full-time writer, and thereafter concentrated on writing novels in order to maintain his income. During this period, he was an active and vocal member of the Baltimore Science Fiction Society, whose members included writers Jack Chalker and Joe and Jack Haldeman among others.

His first fanzine appearance was part one of the story "Conditional Benefit" (Thurban 1 #3, 1953) and his first professional publication and sale was the fantasy short story "Mr. Fuller's Revolt" (Literary Calvalcade, 1954).  As a professional writer, his debut works were the simultaneous publication of "Passion Play" (Amazing, August 1962) and "Horseman!" (Fantastic, August 1962).  "Passion Play" was written and sold first.  His first story to attract major attention was "A Rose for Ecclesiastes", published in The Magazine of Fantasy and Science Fiction, with cover art by Hannes Bok.

Roger Zelazny was also a member of the Swordsmen and Sorcerers' Guild of America (SAGA), a loose-knit group of heroic fantasy authors founded in the 1960s, some of whose works were anthologized in Lin Carter's Flashing Swords! anthologies.

Zelazny died in 1995, aged 58, of kidney failure secondary to colorectal cancer.

Personal life

Zelazny was married twice, first to Sharon Steberl in 1964 (divorced, no children), and then to Judith Alene Callahan in 1966. Prior to this he was engaged to folk singer Hedy West for six months from 1961 to 1962. Roger and Judith had two sons, Devin and Trent (an author of crime fiction), and a daughter, Shannon. At the time of his death, Roger and Judith were separated and he was living with author Jane Lindskold.

Raised as a Catholic by his parents, Zelazny later declared himself a lapsed Catholic and remained that way for the rest of his life. "I did have a strong Catholic background, but I am not a Catholic. Somewhere in the past, I believe I answered in the affirmative once for strange and complicated reasons. But I am not a member of any organized religion."

Zelazny died in Santa Fe on June 16, 1995, of kidney failure associated with cancer. At the time of his death, he had been a twenty-year resident of Santa Fe.

Themes
In his stories, Zelazny frequently portrayed characters from myth, depicted in the modern or a future world. Zelazny included many anachronisms, such as cigarette-smoking and references to modern drama, in his work. His crisp, minimalistic dialogue also seems to be somewhat influenced by the style of wisecracking hardboiled crime authors, such as Raymond Chandler or Dashiell Hammett. The tension between the ancient and the modern, surreal and familiar was what drove most of his work.

A very frequent motif in Zelazny's work is immortality or people who (have) become gods (as well as gods who have turned into people). The mythological traditions his fiction borrowed from include:

 Chinese mythology, in Lord Demon (with Jane Lindskold)
 Egyptian mythology, in Creatures of Light and Darkness
 Greek mythology, in ...And Call Me Conrad
 Hindu mythology, in Lord of Light
 Navajo mythology, in Eye of Cat
 Norse mythology, in The Mask of Loki
 Psychoanalysis, Arthurian mythos, Norse mythology and Kabbalah, in The Dream Master

Additionally, elements from Norse, Japanese and Irish mythology, Arthurian legend, and real history appear in The Chronicles of Amber. A Night in the Lonesome October involves the Cthulhu Mythos in a similar vein.

Aside from working with mythological themes, the most common recurring motif of Zelazny's is the "absent father" (or father-figure). Again, this occurs most notably in the Amber novels: in the first Amber series, the protagonist Corwin searches for his lost, god-like father Oberon; while in the second series, which focuses on Corwin's son Merlin (not to be confused with the Arthurian Merlin), it is Corwin himself who is strangely missing. This somewhat Freudian theme runs through almost every Zelazny novel to a smaller or larger degree. Roadmarks, Doorways in the Sand, Changeling, Madwand, A Dark Traveling; the short stories "Dismal Light", "Godson", "The Keys to December"; and the Alien Speedway series all feature main characters who are either searching for or have lost their fathers. Zelazny's father, Joseph, died unexpectedly in 1962 and never knew his son's successes as a writer; this event may have triggered Zelazny's unconscious and frequent use of the absent father motif.

Two other personal characteristics that influenced his fiction were his expertise in martial arts and his addiction to tobacco. Zelazny became expert with the épée in college, and thus began a lifelong study of several different martial arts, including judo, aikido (which he later taught as well, having gained a black belt), t'ai chi, and pa kua. In turn, many of his characters ably and knowledgeably use similar skills whilst dispatching their opponents. Zelazny was also a passionate cigarette and pipe smoker (until he quit in the early '80s), so much so, that he made many of his protagonists heavy smokers as well. However, he quit in order to improve his cardiovascular fitness for the martial arts; once he had quit, characters in his later novels and short stories stopped smoking too.

Another characteristic of Zelazny's writing is that many of his protagonists had sufficient familiarity with other languages to be able to quote French, German, Italian or Latin aphorisms when the occasion seemed appropriate (or even inappropriate), although Zelazny himself did not speak any of those languages.

He also often experimented with form in his stories. The novel Doorways in the Sand practices a flashback technique in which most chapters open with a scene, typically involving peril, not implied by the end of the previous chapter. Once the scene is established, the narrator backtracks to the events leading up to it, then follows through to the end of the chapter, whereupon the next chapter jumps ahead to another dramatic non-sequitur.

In Roadmarks, a novel about a road system that links all possible times, places and histories, the chapters that feature the protagonist are all titled "One". Other chapters, titled "Two", feature secondary characters, including original characters, pulp heroes, and real historical characters. The "One" storyline is fairly linear, whereas the "Two" storyline jumps around in time and sequence. After finishing the manuscript, Zelazny shuffled the "Two" chapters randomly among the "One" chapters in order to emphasize their non-linear nature relative to the storyline.

Creatures of Light and Darkness, featuring characters in the personae of Egyptian gods, uses a narrative voice entirely in the present tense; the final chapter is structured as a play, and several chapters take the form of long poems.

Zelazny also tended to write a short fragment, not intended for publication, as a kind of backstory for a major character, as a way of giving that character a life independent of the particular novel being worked on. At least one "fragment" was published, the short story Dismal Light, originally a backstory for Isle of the Deads Francis Sandow. Sandow himself figures little in Dismal Light, the main character being his son, who is delaying his escape from an unstable star system in order to force his distant father to come in and ask him personally. While Isle of the Dead has Sandow living a life of irresponsible luxury as an escape from his personal demons, "Dismal Light" anchors his character as one who will face up to his responsibilities, however reluctantly.

Another common stylistic approach in his novels is the use of mixed genres, whereby elements of each are combined freely and interchangeably. Jack of Shadows and Changeling, for example, revolve around the tensions between the two worlds of magic and technology. Lord of Light, perhaps one of his most famous works, is written in the classic style of a mythic fantasy, while it is established early in the book that the story itself takes place on a colonized planet.

Many of Zelazny's works explore variations upon the idea that if there exists an infinite number of worlds, then every world that can be imagined must exist, somewhere. Powerful beings in many of his stories have the ability to travel to worlds that possess precisely the characteristics which that being wishes to experience.  (Zelazny characters with this ability include Thoth in Creatures of Light and Darkness, who teleports to these worlds; those with the royal blood of either Amber or Chaos in The Chronicles of Amber, who "move through shadows" to reach these worlds; the guardian families of A Dark Traveling, who move between realities using high-tech devices; and Red Dorakeen in Roadmarks, who reaches these worlds by driving along a magical highway.)  Many of these same characters wonder whether they are creating these special places anew, or are merely finding places which already exist (very much like "the problem of universals" in classical metaphysics). Usually each character who ponders this ultimately decides that the question is purely academic and therefore unanswerable.

Legacy
Zelazny's stories inspired other authors in his generation including Samuel R. Delany, whose novel Nova and many of his short stories were written "partly in response to Zelazny’s eruption into the field." In 1967 Algis Budrys listed Zelazny, Delany, J. G. Ballard, and Brian W. Aldiss as "an earthshaking new kind of" writers, and leaders of the New Wave. Neil Gaiman said Zelazny was the author who influenced him the most, with this influence particularly seen in Gaiman's literary style and the topics he writes about. Andrzej Sapkowski considered Zelazny his spiritual teacher, whose work inspired him to write his first novel.

The anthology Lord of the Fantastic: Stories in Honor of Roger Zelazny, edited by Martin H. Greenberg, was released in 1998 and featured essays and stories in honor of Zelazny by Walter Jon Williams, Jack Williamson, John Varley, Gaiman, Gregory Benford and many other authors.

The anthology Shadows & Reflections: A Roger Zelazny Tribute Anthology, edited by Trent Zelazny and Warren Lapine, was released in 2017 and featured two essays and fifteen stories set in universes Zelazny created. Contributors included Zelazny, George R.R. Martin, Shannon Zelazny, Warren Lapine, Steven Brust, Kelly McCullough, Jane Lindskold, Steve Perry, Gerald Hausman, Lawrence Watt-Evans, Michael H. Hanson, Mark Rich, Gio Clairval, Edward J. McFadden III, Theodore Krulik, Shariann Lewitt, and Jay O'Connell.

Awards
Zelazny won at least 16 awards for particular works of fiction: six Hugo Awards, three Nebula Awards, two Locus Awards, one Prix Tour-Apollo Award, two Seiun Awards, and two Balrog Awards – very often Zelazny's works competed with each other for the same award.
 ...And Call Me Conrad (published in book form as This Immortal) won the 1966 Hugo Award (novel), a tie with Dune by Frank Herbert.
 "The Doors of His Face, the Lamps of His Mouth" won the 1966 Nebula Award (novelette).
 "He Who Shapes" tied for the 1966 Nebula Award (novella)
 Lord of Light won the 1968 Hugo Award (novel).
 Isle of the Dead won the 1972 Prix Tour-Apollo Award (novel).
 This Immortal won the 1976 Seiun Award (foreign novel).
 "Home Is the Hangman" won both the 1976 Hugo Award and the 1976 Nebula Award (novella).
 "The Last Defender of Camelot" won the 1980 Balrog Award (short fiction).
 "Unicorn Variation" won the 1982 Hugo Award (novelette) and the 1984 Seiun Award (foreign short fiction).
 Unicorn Variations won the 1984 Locus Award (collection) and the 1984 Balrog Award (collection/anthology).
 "24 Views of Mt. Fuji, by Hokusai" won the 1986 Hugo Award (novella).
 Trumps of Doom won the 1986 Locus Award (fantasy novel).
 "Permafrost" won the 1987 Hugo Award (novelette).

In addition, Zelazny was the Worldcon Guest of Honor at Discon II in Washington, D.C. in 1974, and won an Inkpot Award for lifetime achievement at Comic-Con International in 1993. "A Rose for Ecclesiastes" was included in Visions of Mars: First Library on Mars, a DVD taken on board the Phoenix Mars Lander in 2008.

Tributes
The ostracod Sclerocypris zelaznyi was named after him.

Bibliography

References

Further reading
 
Republished as

Biographies and literary critiques
  Essay-length excerpt of full biography published in Collected Stories (next entry).

Bibliographies

External links

 Bibliography
 
 

 Other
 Zelazny obituary at The Washington Post
 Roger Zelazny at the Locus Index to SF Awards
 The Annotated Amber—explanations of some allusions
 Finding aid to the Roger Zelazny papers at the University of Maryland, Baltimore County library

1937 births
1995 deaths
20th-century American male writers
20th-century American novelists
20th-century American poets
20th-century American short story writers
American fantasy writers
American male novelists
American people of Irish descent
American people of Polish descent
American science fiction writers
Case Western Reserve University alumni
Columbia Graduate School of Arts and Sciences alumni
Cthulhu Mythos writers
Former Roman Catholics
Hugo Award-winning writers
Inkpot Award winners
Mensans
Nebula Award winners
Novelists from Ohio
People from Euclid, Ohio
Science Fiction Hall of Fame inductees
Writers from Santa Fe, New Mexico
Writers of modern Arthurian fiction